Maria Theresa of Naples and Sicily (6 June 1772 – 13 April 1807) was the first Empress of Austria and last Holy Roman Empress as the spouse of Francis II. She was born a Princess of Naples as the eldest daughter of King Ferdinand I of the Two Sicilies and Queen Maria Carolina.

Life

Early life
Born on 6 June 1772 at the Royal Palace of Naples, Maria Theresa Carolina Giuseppina was the eldest child of King Ferdinand I of the Two Sicilies and his wife Queen Maria Carolina. She was her mother’s favorite child from birth, and was henceforth named after her maternal grandmother Empress Maria Theresa. Princess Maria Theresa was taught French, mathematics, geography, theology, music, dancing, and drawing.  

In the February of 1790, Archduke Francis’s wife, Duchess Elisabeth, died in childbirth, and it was announced that he would marry one of the princesses of Naples. Maria Theresa and her sister Luisa were both considered for the match. In the end, though, Luisa was chosen to marry Ferdinand III, Grand Duke of Tuscany, and Maria Theresa was to marry Francis. The marriage was in accordance with the traditional Habsburg marriage policy.

Marriage 
On 15 September 1790, at the age of 18, Princess Maria Theresa married her double first cousin Archduke Francis. Francis would, in 1792, become Holy Roman Emperor. Eventually, in 1804, he would become the first Emperor of Austria. The marriage was described as a happy one based on mutual understanding, despite differences in personality. Francis was described as a melancholic character. He was shy and reserved, and was serious with a preference for a spartan lifestyle and duty. Maria Theresa, on the other hand, was described as a gracious blue-eyed blonde with a vivacious personality, a hot temper and a sensual nature. Despite these differences in personality, they were reported to have a good understanding of each other and had a very good relationship.

Maria Theresa reportedly adapted well to her new home in Vienna and did not suffer from homesickness. She participated with enthusiasm in court life, and it was noted that she enjoyed dancing and partaking in carnival balls—even while pregnant. She particularly enjoyed the Waltz, which had been recently introduced as an innovation and became fashionable during her years in Vienna.   

Hedvig Elisabeth Charlotte of Holstein-Gottorp described the view of Maria Theresa and the relationship between the couple in her famous diary during her visit to Vienna in 1798–99: The Empress is reputed to be so jealous that she does not allow him to take part in social life or meet other women. Vicious tongues accuse her of being so passionate that she exhausts her consort and never leaves him alone even for a moment. Although the people of Vienna cannot deny that she is gifted, charitable and carries herself beautifully, she is disliked for her intolerance and for forcing the Emperor to live isolated from everyone. She is also accused of interesting herself in unimportant matters and socializing exclusively with her lady-companions. With them she spends her evenings singing, acting out comedies and being applauded.

On 12 December 1791, the firstborn child of Princess Maria Theresa and Archduke Francis was born: Marie Louise. She was educated specifically in French, English, Spanish, Italian and Latin, with the expectation of her native language German. Marie Louise would soon marry Emperor Napoleon, due to the ongoing wars with France that were effecting her parents and grandparents.

Holy Roman Empress 

In 1792, Maria Theresa’s husband Francis ascended the throne as King of Hungary, Croatia and Bohemia, and she became queen consort. In the same year, she would become Holy Roman Empress. The-then Empress Maria Theresa was interested in politics and came to play a certain role in state affairs due to her influence over her spouse, to whom she acted as an adviser. She was a conservative force and belonged to the critics of King Napoleon, and was reported to have encouraged Francis in an anti-French position during the Napoleonic Wars. She has also been pointed out for being partially responsible for the dismissal of Johann Baptist Freiherr von Schloissnigg and Graf Franz Colloredo.

In the February of 1799, her seeming indifference to the revolution against her parents in Naples attracted some disfavour in Vienna. Although she was her mother’s favorite child, she was bias when it come to their exile during the War.

An important patron of Viennese music, she commissioned many compositions for official and private use. Joseph Haydn wrote his Te Deum for chorus and orchestra at her request. Her favourite composers included Paul Wranitzky and Joseph Leopold Eybler, a composer of sacred music.

Death

In the winter of 1806, Empress Maria Theresa (pregnant with her 12th child) contracted tuberculous pleurisy, which the imperial physician, Andreas Joseph von Stifft, treated with bloodletting. However, it did not trigger an improvement in health, but a premature birth. When Empress Maria Theresa died after following complications after her last childbirth (the daughter died a few days before the mother) on 13 April 1807 at the age of 34, the Emperor was inconsolable and had to be removed by force from the corpse of his wife. She was buried in the Imperial Crypt in Vienna. The shattered Emperor stayed away from the funeral, instead traveling to Buda with his two eldest children. The urn containing her heart was placed in the Heart Crypt and the urn with her entrails in the Ducal Crypt. Empress Maria Theresa is one of the 41 people who received a "separate burial" with the body divided between all three traditional Viennese burial sites of the Habsburgs (Imperial Crypt, Heart Crypt, Duke Crypt).

Issue

Ancestry

References

 This article is based on its equivalent on German Wikipedia

Literature
 Richard Reifenscheid, Die Habsburger in Lebensbildern, Piper 2006
 John A. Rice, Empress Marie Therese and Music at the Viennese Court, 1792–1807, Cambridge 2003
 Friedrich Weissensteiner: Frauen auf Habsburgs Thron – die österreichischen Kaiserinnen, Ueberreuter Wien, 1998,

External links

|-

|-

|-

|-

|-

Holy Roman Empresses
Austrian empresses
German queens consort
Hungarian queens consort
Bohemian queens consort
House of Bourbon-Two Sicilies
House of Habsburg-Lorraine
18th-century Neapolitan people
1772 births
1807 deaths
Neapolitan princesses
Sicilian princesses
Italian Roman Catholics
Austrian princesses
Burials at the Imperial Crypt
Burials at St. Stephen's Cathedral, Vienna
18th-century women of the Holy Roman Empire
Deaths in childbirth
Wives of Francis II, Holy Roman Emperor
Daughters of kings